2012 is a 2009 American science fiction disaster film directed by Roland Emmerich. It was produced by Harald Kloser, Mark Gordon, and Larry J. Franco, and written by Kloser and Emmerich. The film stars John Cusack, Amanda Peet, Chiwetel Ejiofor, Oliver Platt, Thandiwe Newton (credited as Thandie Newton), Danny Glover, and Woody Harrelson. Based on the 2012 phenomenon, its plot follows geologist Adrian Helmsley (Ejiofor) and novelist Jackson Curtis (Cusack) as they experience an eschatological sequence of events including earthquakes, volcanic eruptions, megatsunamis and a global flood, all of which were imagined by subscribers to the hypothesis.

Filming, planned for Los Angeles, began in Vancouver in early August 2008 and wrapped up in mid-October 2008. After a lengthy advertising campaign which included the creation of a website from its main characters' point of view and a viral marketing website on which filmgoers could register for a lottery number to save them from the ensuing disaster, 2012 was released on November 13, 2009, to commercial success, grossing over $791 million worldwide against a production budget of $200 million, becoming the fifth highest-grossing film of 2009. The film received mixed reviews, with praise for its visual effects, but criticism of its screenplay and runtime.

Plot

In 2009, American geologist Adrian Helmsley visits astrophysicist Satnam Tsurutani in India and learns that a new type of neutrino from a solar flare is causing chain reactions in the Earth's core and crust, fulfilling predictions from Charles Hapgood's theory and the Mesoamerican Long Count calendar that a polar shift from the 2012 phenomenon will bring the end of the world. Adrian alerts White House Chief of Staff Carl Anheuser and President Thomas Wilson.

In 2010, Wilson and other world leaders begin building nine arks, each capable of carrying 100,000 people, in the Himalayas in Tibet. Nima, a Buddhist monk, is evacuated with his grandparents, and his brother Tenzin joins the ark project. Tickets are sold to the rich for €1 billion per person to fund the construction.

In 2012, struggling science-fiction writer Jackson Curtis is a chauffeur in Los Angeles for Russian billionaire Yuri Karpov. Jackson's ex-wife Kate and their children, Noah and Lilly, live with Kate's boyfriend, plastic surgeon and amateur pilot Gordon Silberman. Jackson takes Noah and Lilly camping in Yellowstone National Park. When they enter an area fenced off by the United States Army, they are caught and brought to Adrian. After being released, they meet conspiracy theorist Charlie Frost, who warns his listeners through his radio show that the world government is covering up the impending calamity and people are being killed after attempting to warn the public about it. Jackson heeds Charlie's warning after the sudden departure of Yuri's sons Alec and Oleg and then rents a Cessna 340A to rescue his family. As the disaster causes a colossal earthquake, Jackson and his family escaped airborne just before the west coast slides into the ocean. The group flies to Yellowstone and retrieve Charlie's map of the arks' location. The Yellowstone Caldera erupts, with Charlie staying behind to finish his broadcast and dying in the eruption. Needing a fuel-efficient plane, the group lands at Harry Reid International Airport in Las Vegas Valley.

Adrian, Carl, and First Daughter Laura fly to the arks, while President Wilson remains in White House to address the nation. Jackson finds Yuri, Alec and Oleg, Yuri's girlfriend Tamara, and their pilot Sasha. Sasha and Gordon fly them out in an Antonov An-500 as the Yellowstone ash cloud envelops Nevada. Billions die in disasters worldwide, including President Wilson. With the presidential line of succession broken following the Vice President's death and disappearance of the Speaker of the House, Carl appoints himself acting commander-in-chief.

Upon reaching the Himalayas, the plane runs out of fuel. Sasha instructs everyone to escape using a car stored in the hold, while he crash-lands the jet on a glacier which then slides off a cliff, killing him. The survivors are spotted by Chinese Air Force helicopters. Yuri and his sons are taken to the arks, but everyone else are abandoned including Tamara (due to her having an affair with Sasha). Nima takes them to the arks with his family. With Tenzin's help, they stow away on ark 4.

With a tsunami approaching, Carl orders the loading gates be closed though most people have not boarded. Adrian begs the captain and the other arks not to carry out the order. The loading gates are opened and the passengers aboard the arks, but Yuri falls to his death as he pushes his sons into the ark. As the gate closes, Tenzin is injured and Gordon is crushed to death in the gears. The impact driver used to access the ship gets lodged in the gate machinery, preventing it from closing completely and disabling the ship's engines. As the tsunami strikes, the back of the ark starts flooding and it is set adrift, heading for Mount Everest. Adrian rushes to clear the gears, but watertight doors close, trapping the stowaways and drowning Tamara. Noah and Jackson dislodge the tool. The crew regains control of the ark, while Jackson and Noah make it back safely.

Twenty-seven days later, the waters are receding. The arks approach the Cape of Good Hope, where the Drakensberg mountains are the highest mountain range on Earth. Adrian and Laura begin a relationship, while Jackson and Kate reconcile their marriage.

Alternate ending
An alternate ending appears in the film's DVD release. After Ark 4's Captain Michaels announces that they are heading for the Cape of Good Hope, Adrian learns by phone that his father, Harry, and Harry's friend Tony survived a megatsunami which capsized their cruise ship Genesis. Adrian and Laura strike up a friendship with the Curtis family; Kate thanks Laura for taking care of Lilly, Laura tells Jackson that she enjoyed his book Farewell Atlantis, and Jackson and Adrian have a conversation reflecting the events of the worldwide crisis. Carl apologizes to Adrian and Laura for his negligent actions. Jackson returns Noah's cell phone, which he recovered during the Ark 4 flood. The ark finds the shipwrecked Genesis and her survivors on a beach.

Cast

Production

Development
Graham Hancock's Fingerprints of the Gods was listed in 2012 credits as the film's inspiration, and Emmerich said in a Time Out interview: "I always wanted to do a biblical flood movie, but I never felt I had the hook. I first read about the Earth's crust displacement theory in Graham Hancock's Fingerprints of the Gods." He and composer-producer Harald Kloser worked closely together, co-writing a spec script (also titled 2012) which was marketed to studios in February 2008. A number of studios heard a budget projection and story plans from Emmerich and his representatives, a process repeated by the director after Independence Day (1996) and The Day After Tomorrow (2004).

Later that month, Sony Pictures Entertainment received the rights to the spec script. Planned for distribution by Columbia Pictures, 2012 cost less than its budget; according to Emmerich, the film was produced for about $200 million.

Filming, originally scheduled to begin in Los Angeles in July 2008, began in Kamloops, Savona, Cache Creek and Ashcroft, British Columbia in early August 2008 and wrapped up in mid-October 2008. With a Screen Actors Guild strike looming, the film's producers made a contingency plan to salvage it. Uncharted Territory, Digital Domain, Double Negative, Scanline, and Sony Pictures Imageworks were hired to create the film's visual effects.

The film depicts the destruction of several cultural and historical icons around the world. Emmerich said that the Kaaba was considered for selection, but Kloser was concerned about a possible fatwa against him.

Marketing
2012 was marketed by the fictional Institute for Human Continuity, featuring main character Jackson Curtis' book Farewell Atlantis, streaming media, blog updates and radio broadcasts from zealot Charlie Frost on his website, This Is the End. On November 12, 2008, the studio released the first trailer for 2012, which ended with a suggestion to viewers to "find out the truth" by entering "2012" on a search engine. The Guardian called the film's marketing "deeply flawed", associating it with "websites that make even more spurious claims about 2012".

The studio introduced a viral marketing website operated by the fictional Institute for Human Continuity, where filmgoers could register for a lottery number to be part of a small population which would be rescued from the global destruction. David Morrison of NASA, who received over 1,000 inquiries from people who thought the website was genuine, condemned it. "I've even had cases of teenagers writing to me saying they are contemplating suicide because they don't want to see the world end", Morrison said. "I think when you lie on the internet and scare children to make a buck, that is ethically wrong." Another marketing website promoted Farewell Atlantis.

Comcast organized a "roadblock campaign" to promote the film in which a two-minute scene was broadcast on 450 American commercial television networks, local English-language and Spanish-language stations, and 89 cable outlets during a ten-minute window between 10:50 and 11:00 pm Eastern and Pacific Time on October 1, 2009. The scene featured the destruction of Los Angeles and ended with a cliffhanger, with the entire 5:38 clip available on Comcast's Fancast website. According to Variety, "The stunt will put the footage in front of 90% of all households watching ad-supported TV, or nearly 110 million viewers. When combined with online and mobile streams, that could increase to more than 140 million".

Soundtrack
The film's score was composed by Harald Kloser and Thomas Wander. Adam Lambert contributed a song to the film, "Time for Miracles", originally written by Alain Johannes and Natasha Shneider. The 24-song soundtrack includes "Fades Like a Photograph" by Filter and "It Ain't the End of the World" by George Segal and Blu Mankuma. "Master of Shadows" by Two Steps from Hell was used for the film's trailers.

Release
2012 was released to cinemas on November 13, 2009, in Indonesia, Mexico, Sweden, Canada, Denmark, China, India, Italy, the Philippines, Turkey, the United States, and Japan. According to Sony Pictures, the film could have been completed for a summer release but the delay allowed more time for production.

The DVD and Blu-ray versions were released on March 2, 2010. The two-disc Blu-ray edition includes over 90 minutes of features, including Adam Lambert's music video for "Time for Miracles" and a digital copy for PSP, PC, Mac, and iPod. A 3D version was released in Cinemex theaters in Mexico in February 2010. It was later released on Ultra HD Blu-ray on January 19, 2021.

Reception

Box office
2012 grossed $166.1 million in North America and $603.5 million in other territories for a worldwide total of $769.6 million against a production budget of $200 million, making it the first film to gross over $700 million worldwide without crossing $200 million domestically. Worldwide, it was the fifth-highest-grossing 2009 film and the fifth-highest-grossing film distributed by Sony-Columbia, (behind Sam Raimi's Spider-Man trilogy and Skyfall). 2012 is the second-highest-grossing film directed by Roland Emmerich, behind Independence Day (1996). It earned $230.5 million on its worldwide opening weekend, the fourth-largest opening of 2009 and for Sony-Columbia.

2012 ranked number one on its opening weekend, grossing $65,237,614 on its first weekend (the fourth-largest opening for a disaster film). Outside North America it is the 28th-highest-grossing film, the fourth-highest-grossing 2009 film, and the second-highest-grossing film distributed by Sony-Columbia, after Skyfall. 2012 earned $165.2 million on its opening weekend, the 20th-largest overseas opening. Its largest opening was in France and the Maghreb ($18.0 million). In total earnings, the film's three highest-grossing territories after North America were China ($68.7 million), France and the Maghreb ($44.0 million), and Japan ($42.6 million).

In 2020, the film received renewed interest during the COVID-19 pandemic, becoming the second-most popular film and seventh-most popular overall title on Netflix in March 2020.

Critical response
On Rotten Tomatoes, the film has an approval rating of 39% based on 247 reviews and an average rating of 5.20/10. The site's critical consensus reads, "Roland Emmerich's 2012 provides plenty of visual thrills, but lacks a strong enough script to support its massive scope and inflated length." On Metacritic, the film has a score of 49 out of 100 based on 34 critics, indicating "mixed or average reviews". Audiences polled by CinemaScore gave the film an average grade of "B+" on an A+ to F scale.

Roger Ebert praised 2012, giving it  stars out of 4 and saying that it "delivers what it promises and since no sentient being will buy a ticket expecting anything else, it will be, for its audiences, one of the most satisfactory films of the year". Ebert and Claudia Puig of USA Today called the film the "mother of all disaster movies". Dan Kois of The Washington Post gave the film 4/4 stars, deeming it "the crowning achievement in Emmerich's long, profitable career as a destroyer of worlds." Jim Schembri of The Age gave the film 4/5 stars, describing it as "a great, big, fat, stupid, greasy cheeseburger of a movie designed to show, in vivid detail, what the end of human civilisation will look like according to his vast army of brilliant visual effects artists."

Peter Travers of Rolling Stone compared the film to Transformers: Revenge of the Fallen, writing: "Beware 2012, which works the dubious miracle of almost matching Transformers 2 for sheer, cynical, mind-numbing, time-wasting, money-draining, soul-sucking stupidity." Rick Groen of The Globe and Mail gave the film 1/4 stars, writing: "As always in Emmerich's rollicking Armageddons, the cannon speaks with an expensive bang, while the fodder gets afforded nary a whimper." Christopher Orr of The New Republic wrote that the film's "ludicrous thrills begin burning themselves out by the movie’s midpoint", and added: "As the movie approaches its two-and-a-half hour mark, you, too, may feel that The End can’t come soon enough." Tim Robey of The Daily Telegraph gave the film 2/5 stars, saying that it was "dim, dim, dim, and so absurdly overscaled that we're not supposed to mind." Linda Barnard of the Toronto Star gave the film 1/4 stars, writing: "the clunky script and kitchen-sink approach to Emmerich's global apocalypse tale... makes the movie fail on a bunch of fronts."

Accolades

Canceled television spin-off

In 2010 Entertainment Weekly reported a planned spin-off television series, 2013, which would have been a sequel to the film. 2012 executive producer Mark Gordon told the magazine, "ABC will have an opening in their disaster-related programming after Lost ends, so people would be interested in this topic on a weekly basis. There's hope for the world despite the magnitude of the 2012 disaster as seen in the film. After the movie, there are some people who survive, and the question is how will these survivors build a new world and what will it look like. That might make an interesting TV series." However, plans were canceled for budget reasons. It would have been Emmerich's third film to spawn a spin-off; the first was Stargate (followed by Stargate SG-1, Stargate Infinity, Stargate Atlantis, Stargate Universe), and the second was Godzilla (followed by the animated Godzilla: The Series).

Notes

References

External links

 
 
 
 
 
 
 
 

2000s disaster films
2009 science fiction action films
2000s American films
2009 films
2012 phenomenon
American disaster films
American science fiction action films
Centropolis Entertainment films
Columbia Pictures films
D-Box motion-enhanced films
Extinction in fiction
Films about earthquakes
Films about fictional presidents of the United States
Films about technology
Films based on urban legends
Films directed by Roland Emmerich
Films scored by Harald Kloser
Films shot in India
Films set in 2009
Films set in 2010
Films set in 2011
Films set in 2012
Films set in China
Apocalyptic films
Films set in the Himalayas
Films set in India
Films set in London
Films set in Los Angeles
Films set in the Yellowstone National Park
Films set in Paris
Films set in the Las Vegas Valley
Films set in the Pacific Ocean
Films about Tibet
Films set in Tokyo
Films set in Vatican City
Films set in Washington, D.C.
Films set in the White House
Films set in Wyoming
Films set on airplanes
Films set on ships
Films set in the future
Films shot in Vancouver
Fiction about government
Films about tsunamis
Films about Yellowstone Caldera
American science fiction adventure films
American 3D films
United States presidential succession in fiction
Censored films
Cultural depictions of Elizabeth II
2000s English-language films
Science fiction disaster films